The Grand prix Jean Giono is a French literary prize. It was established in 1990 at the initiative of Michel Albert, to honour the writer Jean Giono. Since 1992 it consists of two categories: the Jean Giono Grand Prize (Grand prix Jean Giono) and the Jury Prize (Prix du Jury). The winner of the Grand prix Jean Giono receives 10,000 euros.

Grand prix Jean Giono 
Given to a French-language author who has "defended or illustrated the novel's case".
 1990: Yves Beauchemin for Juliette Permerleau (de Fallois)
 1991: Michel Calonne for Les Enfances
 1992: François Nourissier for Gardien des ruines (Éditions Grasset)
 1993: Félicien Marceau for La Terrasse de Lucrezia (Éditions Gallimard)
 1994: Jacques Laurent for L'Inconnu du temps qui passe (Grasset)
 1995: Vladimir Volkoff for Le Grand Tsar blanc (de Fallois)
 1996: Michel Déon for The Great and the Good (La Cour des grands) (Gallimard)
 1997: J. M. G. Le Clézio for Poisson d'or (Gallimard)
 1998: Sylvie Germain for Tobie des marais (Gallimard)
 1999: Jean d'Ormesson for Le Rapport Gabriel (Gallimard)
 2001: Jean Raspail for Adíos, tierra delfuego (Albin Michel)
 2002: Serge Rezvani for L'Amour en face (Actes Sud)
 2004: Pierre Moinot for Coup d'État (Gallimard)
 2005: Danièle Sallenave for La Fraga (Gallimard)
 2006: Pascal Quignard for Villa Amalia, Gallimard
 2008: Amélie Nothomb for The Prince's Act (Le Fait du prince) (Albin Michel)
 2009: Dominique Fernandez for Ramon (Grasset
 2013: Pierre Jourde for La Première Pierre, Gallimard
 2014: Fouad Laroui for Les Tribulations du dernier Sijilmassi (éditions Julliard)
 2015: Charif Majdalani for Villa des femmes, Seuil
 2016: Alain Blottière for Comment Baptiste est mort, Gallimard
 2017: Jean-René Van der Plaetsen for  Grasset
 2018: Paul Greveillac for   Gallimard
 2019: Jean-Luc Coatalem for La Part du fils Stock
 2020:  for Buveurs de vent Albin Michel

Jury Prize
Given for a French-language work of literature of any type, with focus on imagination and storytelling in the spirit of Jean Giono.
 1992: François Bontempelli for L'Arbre du voyageur
 1993: Marc Bressant for L'Anniversaire (de Fallois)
 1994: Georges-Olivier Châteaureynaud for Le Château de verre (Julliard)
 1995: Amélie Nothomb for The Stranger Next Door (Les Catilinaires) (Albin Michel)
 1997: Jean-Pierre Milovanoff for Le Maître des paons (Julliard)
 1998: Dominique Muller for Les Caresses et les Baisers (Seuil)
 1999: Michèle Desbordes for La Demande
 2000: Daniel Arsand for En silence (Phébus)
 2001: Isabelle Hausser for La Table des enfants (de Fallois)
 2002: Stéphane Héaume for Le Clos Lothar (Zulma)
 2003: Yasmina Reza for Adam Haberberg (Albin Michel)
 2004: Laurent Gaudé for The Scortas' Sun (Le Soleil des Scorta) (Actes Sud)
 2005: Armel Job for Les Fausses Innocences (Robert Laffont)
 2006: François Vallejo for Ouest (Viviane Hamy)
 2008: Jean-Marie Blas de Roblès for 
 2009: Brigitte Giraud for Une année étrangère (Stock)
 2010: Jean-Baptiste Harang for Nos cœurs vaillants (éditions Grasset)

References

Awards established in 1990
French literary awards
Jean Giono

1990 establishments in France